Cambodia–Canada relations refers to the bilateral relations between Cambodia and  Canada. The Canadian embassy in Bangkok, Thailand is also accredited to Cambodia, and has an office in Phnom Penh. Cambodia is represented in Canada through its UN mission in New York City.

History 
Canada supported the continued UN recognition of the (Coalition Government of) Democratic Kampuchea even after its 1979 loss of power in Phnom Penh, until the restoration of the Kingdom of Cambodia.

In 1997, Canadian foreign minister Lloyd Axworthy considered, but ultimately rejected, an American proposal to try Pol Pot on its soil under domestic war crimes legislation.

Canadian foreign minister, Stephane Dion, visited Cambodia in 2016.

Peacekeeping 
Over 1,000 Canadian UN peacekeepers have served in Cambodia in the ICSC, UNAMIC, and UNTAC missions.

Immigration 
Canada took in 18,602 Cambodian refugees through UN resettlement from 1980 to 1992.

There are currently some 34,340 Cambodian Canadians living in Canada. Cambodian communities can be found in Montreal, Toronto and Alberta.

There is also a large concentration of Cambodians in British Columbia, of some 2,385 people.

Trade 
In 2013, bilateral merchandise trade between Canada and Cambodia exceeded $700 million, with Canada ranking as one of Cambodia's most important destination countries for its exports.

References

Further reading 

 
Canada
Cambodia